Vladimir Vasilyevich Ustinov (born 25 February 1953) is a Russian politician. Since 2008 he is the Plenipotentiary Envoy to the Southern Federal District. Until 2008, he was Russia's Minister of Justice. He was Vladimir Putin's first General Prosecutor of Russia from 2000 to June 2006.

Sanctions
In April 2018, the United States imposed sanctions on him and 23 other Russian nationals.

Personal life
He is married to a housewife, Nadezhda Aleksandrovna Ustinova, and they have a son, Dmitry, and a daughter, Irina.

Dmitry Ustinov ( b. 1979) is a Russian intelligence agent and graduate of the FSB Academy. Dmitry Ustinov married Inga Sechina, a daughter of Igor Sechin, on 22 November 2003. Dmitry and Inga have a son born 4 July 2005. As of 2014, Dmitry and Inga are divorced.

Irina Dmitrievna Ustinova, in 2010, lived in Sochi and is an assistant prosecutor in south Russia's Khostinsky district, a district of the city of Sochi.

Honours and awards
 Hero of the Russian Federation - by secret presidential decree, publicised in spring, 2005, by the President of the State Duma, Alexander Kotenkov
 Order of Merit for the Fatherland, 3rd class (4 December 1999) - for his great personal contribution to strengthening the rule of law in the Republic of Dagestan
 Order of Courage, twice
 Honoured Lawyer of the Russian Federation (9 January 1997)
 Order of Saint Blessed Prince Dimitry Donskoy great, 1st class

Works
 Vladimir Ustinov. Indictment of Terror. 192 pp. Olma-Press Publishers, Moscow, 2003. .

References

External links
Biography by Vladimir Pribylovsky (in Russian).

See also 
 Three Whales Corruption Scandal

Justice ministers of Russia
Living people
1953 births
1st class Active State Councillors of the Russian Federation
Heroes of the Russian Federation
Recipients of the Order "For Merit to the Fatherland", 3rd class
Recipients of the Order of Courage
Medvedev Administration personnel
General Prosecutors of Russia
20th-century Russian lawyers
21st-century Russian lawyers
20th-century Russian politicians
21st-century Russian politicians
People from Nikolayevsk-on-Amur
Russian individuals subject to the U.S. Department of the Treasury sanctions